Nyírbátor is a district in south-eastern part of Szabolcs-Szatmár-Bereg County. Nyírbátor is also the name of the town where the district seat is found. The district is located in the Northern Great Plain Statistical Region. This district is a part of Nyírség geographical region.

Geography 
Nyírbátor District borders with Baktalórántháza District and Mátészalka District to the north, the Romanian county of Satu Mare to the east, Romanian county of Bihor and Nyíradony District (Hajdú-Bihar County) to the south, Nagykálló District to the west. The number of the inhabited places in Nyírbátor District is 20.

Municipalities 
The district has 3 towns, 2 large villages and 15 villages.
(ordered by population, as of 1 January 2013)

The bolded municipalities are cities, italics municipalities are large villages.

Demographics

In 2011, it had a population of 43,040 and the population density was 62/km².

Ethnicity
Besides the Hungarian majority, the main minorities are the Roma (approx. 6,000) and Romanian (100).

Total population (2011 census): 43,040
Ethnic groups (2011 census): Identified themselves: 44,442 persons:
Hungarians: 38,353 (86.30%)
Gypsies: 5,570 (12.53%)
Others and indefinable: 519 (1.17%)
Approx. 1,500 persons in Nyírbátor District did declare more than one ethnic group at the 2011 census.

Religion
Religious adherence in the county according to 2011 census:

Catholic – 21,094 (Greek Catholic – 12,538; Roman Catholic – 8,556);
Reformed – 11,364;
Evangelical – 45;
other religions – 314;
Non-religious – 2,317; 
Atheism – 105;
Undeclared – 7,801.

Gallery

See also
List of cities and towns of Hungary

References

External links
 Postal codes of the Nyírbátor District

Districts in Szabolcs-Szatmár-Bereg County